This is a list of municipalities in Austria which have standing links to local communities in other countries known as "town twinning" (usually in Europe) or "sister cities" (usually in the rest of the world). Some of these partnerships have a historical background that goes back to the time of the Austrian Empire.

A
Abtenau

 Big Bear Lake, United States
 Münster, Germany

Adnet
 Oppenheim, Germany

Albeck

 Fiume Veneto, Italy
 Langenau, Germany

Alberndorf im Pulkautal

 Hainburg, Germany
 Trumau, Austria
 Vernouillet, France

Alberndorf in der Riedmark
 Wackersdorf, Germany

Altmünster
 Düren, Germany

Amstetten

 Alsfeld, Germany
 Pergine Valsugana, Italy
 Ruelle-sur-Touvre, France

Anif
 Eppan an der Weinstraße, Italy

Ansfelden
 Condega, Nicaragua

Arnoldstein

 Črna na Koroškem, Slovenia
 Mežica, Slovenia
 Tarcento, Italy

Aschau im Zillertal
 Oberwil, Switzerland

Asperhofen
 Zalakaros, Hungary

Attnang-Puchheim
 Puchheim, Germany

Axams
 Rohrbach, Germany

B

Ba–Bl
Bad Aussee
 Plaisir, France

Bad Großpertholz
 Lomnice nad Lužnicí, Czech Republic

Bad Ischl

 Gödöllő, Hungary
 Opatija, Croatia

Bad Mitterndorf
 Röttingen, Germany

Bad Radkersburg

 Gornja Radgona, Slovenia
 Lenti, Hungary
 Varaždin, Croatia

Bad Sauerbrunn
 Spalt, Germany

Bad Schallerbach
 Koksijde, Belgium

Bad Vöslau
 Neu-Isenburg, Germany

Bad Wimsbach-Neydharting
 Friedrichsdorf, Germany

Baumgartenberg
 Pirk, Germany

Berndorf

 Hanamaki, Japan
 Sigmundsherberg, Austria

Bischofshofen
 Unterhaching, Germany

Bleiburg
 Lovran, Croatia

Bludenz

 Borgo Valsugana, Italy
 Plettenberg, Germany

Br–Bu
Brand-Nagelberg
 Suchdol nad Lužnicí, Czech Republic

Braunau am Inn
 Lavarone, Italy

Bregenz

 Acre, Israel
 Bangor, Northern Ireland, United Kingdom

Breitenbrunn am Neusiedler See
 Breitenbrunn, Germany

Breitenwang
 Ōshū, Japan

Brixlegg
 Aichach, Germany

Bromberg
 Wilhelmshaven, Germany

Bruck an der Großglocknerstraße

 Agneaux, France
 Bad Emstal, Germany

Bruck an der Leitha
 Bruckmühl, Germany

Bruck an der Mur

 Farra d'Isonzo, Italy
 Hagen, Germany
 Liévin, France
 Veroli, Italy
 Zalalövő, Hungary

Bruckneudorf
 Hódmezővásárhely, Hungary

Burgkirchen
 Füllinsdorf, Switzerland

D
Deutsch Jahrndorf

 Hamuliakovo, Slovakia
 Rajka, Hungary

Deutsch-Griffen
 Utenbach (Mertendorf), Germany

Deutsch-Wagram

 Calheta de São Miguel, Cape Verde
 Gbely, Slovakia

Deutschkreuz

 Allumiere, Italy
 Nagycenk, Hungary
 Wetter, Germany

Dobersberg
 Slavonice, Czech Republic

Dornbirn

 Dubuque, United States
 Kecskemét, Hungary
 Sélestat, France

E
Ebensee am Traunsee

 Prato, Italy
 Zawiercie, Poland

Eberschwang
 Kisújszállás, Hungary

Ebreichsdorf

 Šumperk, Czech Republic
 Ziębice, Poland

Eisenkappel-Vellach
 Kranj, Slovenia

Eisenstadt

 Bad Kissingen, Germany
 Colmar, France
 Goyang, South Korea
 Sanuki, Japan
 Sopron, Hungary

Eitzing
 Wald, Germany

Eltendorf
 Obergriesbach, Germany

Enns

 Dingolfing, Germany
 Zeltweg, Austria

Euratsfeld
 Strání, Czech Republic

F
Falkenstein

 Blatnička, Czech Republic
 Falkenstein, Germany

Fehring
 Heinersreuth, Germany

Feistritz an der Gail
 Malborghetto Valbruna, Italy

Feistritz ob Bleiburg
 Brda, Slovenia

Feldbach

 Adelsdorf, Germany
 Siklós, Hungary
 Żywiec, Poland

Feldkirch
 Sigmaringen, Germany

Feldkirchen bei Graz
 Hennstedt, Germany

Feldkirchen in Kärnten

 Ahrensburg, Germany
 Bamberg, Germany

Ferlach

 Sponheim, Germany
 Tržič, Slovenia

Ferndorf
 Kreuztal, Germany

Finkenstein am Faaker See
 Pavia di Udine, Italy

Fischamend
 Püspökladány, Hungary

Frankenburg am Hausruck
 Vernon, Canada

Frankenfels
 Hollstadt, Germany

Freistadt

 Kaplice, Czech Republic
 Rožmberk nad Vltavou, Czech Republic

Friedberg

 Friedberg, Germany

 Söchtenau, Germany

Friesach

 Bad Griesbach, Germany
 Cormons, Italy

Frohnleiten
 Schnaittach, Germany

Fulpmes
 Villepreux, France

Fürstenfeld

 Aindling, Germany
 Körmend, Hungary
 Vişeu de Sus, Romania
 Zug, Switzerland

Furth an der Triesting
 Zubří, Czech Republic

Furth bei Gottweig

 Domažlice, Czech Republic
 Furth im Wald, Germany
 Ludres, France

G
Gaal
 Gyenesdiás, Hungary

Gaflenz
 Käerjeng, Luxembourg

Gallneukirchen
 Northeim, Germany

Gaming

 Bad Sassendorf, Germany
 Groß-Siegharts, Austria

Gars am Kamp
 Gars am Inn, Germany

Gänserndorf
 Malacky, Slovakia

Glanegg
 Cassacco, Italy

Gleisdorf

 Aszófő, Hungary
 Nagykanizsa, Hungary
 Winterbach, Germany

Gmünd
 Medulin, Croatia

Gmünd in Kärnten
 Osnabrück, Germany

Gmunden

 Faenza, Italy
 Tornesch, Germany

Gols

 Rača (Bratislava), Slovakia
 Rottenburg am Neckar, Germany

Grafenegg
 Freudenberg, Germany

Grafenwörth

 Grafenwöhr, Germany
 Raiding, Austria
 Serravalle Pistoiese, Italy

Gratkorn
 Palazzolo dello Stella, Italy

Gratwein-Straßengel

 Ebrach, Germany
 Komárom, Hungary

Graz

 Coventry, England, United Kingdom
 Darmstadt, Germany
 Dubrovnik, Croatia
 Groningen, Netherlands
 Ljubljana, Slovenia
 Maribor, Slovenia
 Montclair, United States
 Pécs, Hungary
 Pula, Croatia

 Timișoara, Romania
 Trieste, Italy
 Trondheim, Norway

Grein

 Hluboká nad Vltavou, Czech Republic
 Neckarsteinach, Germany

Groß-Siegharts

 Dačice, Czech Republic
 Gaming, Austria
 Poniatowa, Poland

Grünbach am Schneeberg
 Emmerting, Germany

Gumpoldskirchen

 Leibnitz, Austria
 Vilsbiburg, Germany

Guntersdorf
 Herborn, Germany

Gurk
 Arnstadt, Germany

Güssing
 Nijlen, Belgium

H
Haiming
 Oxapampa, Peru

Hainburg an der Donau

 Rodgau, Germany
 Šamorín, Slovakia

Hall in Tirol

 Iserlohn, Germany
 Sommacampagna, Italy
 Winterthur, Switzerland

Hallstatt
 Hallstadt, Germany

Hard

 Bagnoli di Sopra, Italy
 Balgach, Switzerland

Hausmannstätten
 Pécsvárad, Hungary

Heidenreichstein
 Nová Bystřice, Czech Republic

Heiligenblut am Großglockner

 Friedrichroda, Germany
 Julian, United States
 Sodankylä, Finland

Hennersdorf

 Jindřichov, Czech Republic
 Neuweiler, Germany

Hermagor-Pressegger See
 Pontebba, Italy

Himmelberg

 Bad Saulgau, Germany
 Chiusaforte, Italy

Hohenems

 Bystré, Czech Republic
 Ostfildern, Germany
 Polička, Czech Republic

Hohenzell
 Polling, Germany

Hollabrunn

 Holíč, Slovakia
 Jinhua, China
 Kyjov, Czech Republic

Hollersbach im Pinzgau
 La Gacilly, France

Horn
 Slavkov u Brna, Czech Republic

Hüttenberg
 Altmannstein, Germany

I
Imst
 Rottweil, Germany

Innsbruck

 Aalborg, Denmark
 Freiburg im Breisgau, Germany
 Grenoble, France
 Kraków, Poland
 New Orleans, United States
 Sarajevo, Bosnia and Herzegovina
 Tbilisi, Georgia

Ischgl
 Schengen, Luxembourg

J
Jenbach
 Posina, Italy

Judenburg is a member of the Douzelage, a town twinning association of towns across the European Union. Judenburg also has one other twin town.

Douzelage
 Agros, Cyprus
 Altea, Spain
 Asikkala, Finland
 Bad Kötzting, Germany
 Bellagio, Italy
 Bundoran, Ireland
 Chojna, Poland
 Granville, France
 Holstebro, Denmark
 Houffalize, Belgium
 Kőszeg, Hungary
 Marsaskala, Malta
 Meerssen, Netherlands
 Niederanven, Luxembourg
 Oxelösund, Sweden
 Preveza, Greece
 Rokiškis, Lithuania
 Rovinj, Croatia
 Sesimbra, Portugal
 Sherborne, England, United Kingdom
 Sigulda, Latvia
 Siret, Romania
 Škofja Loka, Slovenia
 Sušice, Czech Republic
 Tryavna, Bulgaria
 Türi, Estonia
 Zvolen, Slovakia
Other
 Massa e Cozzile, Italy

K
Kalwang
 Bő, Hungary

Kapfenberg
 Frechen, Germany

Karlstetten
 Pleiskirchen, Germany

Kautzen
 Moravské Budějovice, Czech Republic

Keutschach am See

 Medea, Italy
 Šempeter-Vrtojba, Slovenia

Kindberg

 Roßdorf, Germany
 Vösendorf, Austria

Kirchbach

 Gárdony, Hungary
 Paularo, Italy

Kitzbühel

 Bad Soden, Germany
 Greenwich, United States
 Rueil-Malmaison, France
 Sterzing, Italy
 Sun Valley, United States
 Yamagata, Japan

Klagenfurt

 Chernivtsi, Ukraine
 Dachau, Germany
 Dessau-Roßlau, Germany
 Dushanbe, Tajikistan
 Gladsaxe, Denmark
 Gorizia, Italy
 Laval, Canada
 Nanning, China
 Nof HaGalil, Israel
 Nova Gorica, Slovenia
 Rzeszów, Poland
 Sibiu, Romania
 Tarragona, Spain
 Wiesbaden, Germany
 Zalaegerszeg, Hungary

Klein Sankt Paul
 Colloredo di Monte Albano, Italy

Klosterneuburg
 Göppingen, Germany

Knittelfeld

 Barcs, Hungary
 Kameoka, Japan

Köflach
 Giengen an der Brenz, Germany

Königsdorf
 Königsdorf, Germany

Kopfing im Innkreis

 Aidenbach, Germany
 Ringelai, Germany

Koppl
 Zirndorf, Germany

Kramsach
 Azumino, Japan

Kraubath an der Mur
 Koszęcin, Poland

Krems an der Donau

 Beaune, France
 Böblingen, Germany
 Esbjerg, Denmark
 Grapevine, United States
 Kroměříž, Czech Republic
 Passau, Germany

Krenglbach
 Császártöltés, Hungary

Krumpendorf am Wörthersee

 Gyula, Hungary
 Pamhagen, Austria

Kuchl
 San Giovanni al Natisone, Italy

Kufstein

 Frauenfeld, Switzerland
 Langenlois, Austria
 Rovereto, Italy

L
Laa an der Thaya

 Garching an der Alz, Germany
 Świętochłowice, Poland

Laakirchen

 Gemona del Friuli, Italy
 Obertshausen, Germany

Lambach
 Reichenschwand, Germany

Langenwang
 Nittendorf, Germany

Lannach
 Alling, Germany

Lassee is a member of the Charter of European Rural Communities, a town twinning association across the European Union, alongside with:

 Bienvenida, Spain
 Bièvre, Belgium
 Bucine, Italy
 Cashel, Ireland
 Cissé, France
 Desborough, England, United Kingdom
 Esch (Haaren), Netherlands
 Hepstedt, Germany
 Ibănești, Romania
 Kandava (Tukums), Latvia
 Kannus, Finland
 Kolindros, Greece
 Medzev, Slovakia
 Moravče, Slovenia
 Næstved, Denmark
 Nagycenk, Hungary
 Nadur, Malta
 Ockelbo, Sweden
 Pano Lefkara, Cyprus
 Põlva, Estonia
 Samuel (Soure), Portugal
 Slivo Pole, Bulgaria
 Starý Poddvorov, Czech Republic
 Strzyżów, Poland
 Tisno, Croatia
 Troisvierges, Luxembourg
 Žagarė (Joniškis), Lithuania

Laxenburg
 Gödöllő, Hungary

Lech

 Beaver Creek, United States
 Hakuba, Japan
 Kampen, Germany

Leibnitz

 Fiumicello Villa Vicentina, Italy
 Gumpoldskirchen, Austria
 Mira, Italy
 Pedra Badejo, Cape Verde

Leoben
 Xuzhou, China

Leutasch
 Hida, Japan

Leutschach an der Weinstraße
 Kungota, Slovenia

Lienz

 Gorizia, Italy
 Jackson, United States
 Selçuk, Turkey

Liezen

 Solms, Germany
 Telšiai, Lithuania

Lilienfeld

 Jōetsu, Japan
 Třebíč, Czech Republic

Linz

 Albufeira, Portugal
 Brașov, Romania
 České Budějovice, Czech Republic
 Charlottenburg-Wilmersdorf (Berlin), Germany
 Chengdu, China
 Dodoma, Tanzania
 Eskişehir, Turkey
 Gwangyang, South Korea
 Halle, Germany
 Kansas City, United States
 Linköping, Sweden
 Linz am Rhein, Germany
 Modena, Italy
 Nasushiobara, Japan
 Nizhny Novgorod, Russia
 Norrköping, Sweden
 San Carlos, Nicaragua
 Tampere, Finland
 Tuzla, Bosnia and Herzegovina
 Zaporizhia, Ukraine

Litzelsdorf
 Memmingen, Germany

Ludmannsdorf
 Monrupino, Italy

Lurnfeld
 Mariano del Friuli, Italy

M
Mallnitz
 Witten, Germany

Maria Saal

 Aquileia, Italy
 Forgaria nel Friuli, Italy
 Gornji Grad, Slovenia

Maria Wörth

 Aretxabaleta, Spain
 Codroipo, Italy
 Freising, Germany

Mariapfarr
 Matadepera, Spain

Mariazell

 Altötting, Germany
 Esztergom, Hungary

Mattersburg
 Kapuvár, Hungary

Mattsee
 Bühl, Germany

Mautern in Steiermark

 Mautern an der Donau, Austria
 Tipperary, Ireland

Mauterndorf
 Cadolzburg, Germany

Mauthausen

 Cogollo del Cengio, Italy
 Prachatice, Czech Republic

Mayrhofen

 Bad Homburg vor der Höhe, Germany
 Cabourg, France
 Chur, Switzerland
 Mondorf-les-Bains, Luxembourg
 Terracina, Italy

Micheldorf
 Villesse, Italy

Michelhausen
 Ždírec nad Doubravou, Czech Republic

Mieming
 Limas, France

Millstatt am See

 Heligoland, Germany
 San Daniele del Friuli, Italy
 Wendlingen, Germany

Mistelbach

 Neumarkt in der Oberpfalz, Germany
 Pécel, Hungary

Mitterkirchen im Machland
 Mitterskirchen, Germany

Mittersill

 Büren, Germany
 Tricesimo, Italy

Mödling

 Dirmstein, Germany
 Esch-sur-Alzette, Luxembourg
 Kőszeg, Hungary
 Obzor (Nesebar), Bulgaria
 Offenbach am Main, Germany
 Puteaux, France
 Velletri, Italy
 Vsetín, Czech Republic
 Zemun (Belgrade), Serbia
 Zottegem, Belgium

Molln

 Buseck, Germany
 Tát, Hungary

Mondsee
 Saint-Jean-d'Angély, France

Moosburg

 Katerini, Greece
 Maintal, Germany
 Moosburg an der Isar, Germany

Murau
 Fagagna, Italy

Mürzzuschlag

 Arusha, Tanzania
 Blansko, Czech Republic
 Chillán, Chile
 Pengzhou, China
 Treptow-Köpenick (Berlin), Germany

N
Neudau
 Celldömölk, Hungary

Neudörfl
 Zollikofen, Switzerland

Neuhofen an der Krems

 Gornji Vakuf-Uskoplje, Bosnia and Herzegovina
 Gusow-Platkow, Germany
 Tiszaújváros, Hungary

Neukirchen am Großvenediger
 Hünstetten, Germany

Neumarkt in der Steiermark
 Monfalcone, Italy

Neunkirchen

 Pausa-Mühltroff, Germany
 West Lindsey, England, United Kingdom

Neusiedl am See

 Deggendorf, Germany
 Mosonmagyaróvár, Hungary
 Pezinok, Slovakia

Neustift im Stubaital
 Kusatsu, Japan

Nickelsdorf
 Pusztavám, Hungary

Nötsch im Gailtal
 Buttrio, Italy

O
Obdach

 Kötz, Germany
 Telšiai, Lithuania

Oberdrauburg

 Kötschach-Mauthen, Austria
 Paluzza, Italy
 Signa, Italy
 Türkenfeld, Germany

Oberndorf bei Salzburg

 Oberndorf am Neckar, Germany
 Traismauer, Austria

Obervellach

 Budapest XV (Budapest), Hungary
 Dilbeek, Belgium
 Freising, Germany
 Hemer, Germany
 Kreuzau, Germany
 Muggia, Italy
 Seltz, France
 Škofja Loka, Slovenia

Oberwart
 Szombathely, Hungary

Orth an der Donau
 Fehmarn, Germany

Ottensheim

 Furth, Germany
 Jajce, Bosnia and Herzegovina

P
Parndorf

 Senec, Slovakia
 Senj, Croatia

Perchtoldsdorf
 Donauwörth, Germany

Perg
 Schrobenhausen, Germany

Pettenbach
 Tuchów, Poland

Pfaffstätten
 Alzenau, Germany

Pichl bei Wels
 Thyrnau, Germany

Pinsdorf
 Altdorf, Germany

Pöchlarn
 Riedlingen, Germany

Poggersdorf

 Sagrado, Italy
 Schwebheim, Germany

Pöls-Oberkurzheim

 Mainhausen, Germany
 Medulin, Croatia

Pöndorf
 Schwaigern, Germany

Pottendorf
 San Lorenzo Isontino, Italy

Pottenstein

 Potštejn, Czech Republic
 Pottenstein, Germany

Poysdorf
 Dettelbach, Germany

Puchenau
 Lindberg, Germany

Pulkau
 Moravské Budějovice, Czech Republic

Purbach am Neusiedlersee

 Kulmain, Germany
 Montalcino, Italy
 Teaca, Romania

Purgstall an der Erlauf

 Linden, Germany
 Machern, Germany
 Maków, Poland

Purkersdorf

 Bad Säckingen, Germany
 Sanary-sur-Mer, France

R
Raabs an der Thaya

 Jemnice, Czech Republic
 Reszel, Poland

Rabensburg
 Lanžhot, Czech Republic

Radenthein

 Ampezzo, Italy
 Schorndorf, Germany

Ramsau am Dachstein
 Bohinj, Slovenia

Reichenau an der Rax
 Latisana, Italy

Reichenfels
 Aurachtal, Germany

Reith bei Kitzbühel
 Wetzlar, Germany

Retz 

 Hainburg, Germany
 Rötz, Germany
 Znojmo, Czech Republic

Reutte
 Ōshū, Japan

Ried im Innkreis
 Landshut, Germany

Rohrbach bei Mattersburg
 Rohrbach, Germany

Roppen
 Forchheim, Germany

Rosegg

 Bohinj, Slovenia
 Lauco, Italy
 Osoppo, Italy
 Zuglio, Italy

Rust

 Kulmbach, Germany
 Tokaj, Hungary

S

Sa
Saalbach-Hinterglemm
 Biei, Japan

Saalfelden am Steinernen Meer

 Grimbergen, Belgium
 Rankoshi, Japan
 Rödermark, Germany

Sachsenburg
 Spilimbergo, Italy

Salzburg

 Dresden, Germany
 León, Nicaragua
 Merano, Italy
 Reims, France
 Shanghai, China
 Singida, Tanzania
 Verona, Italy
 Vilnius, Lithuania

Sandl
 Rudolfov, Czech Republic

Sankt Andrä
 Jelsa, Croatia

Sankt Andrä-Wördern
 Greifenstein, Germany

Sankt Anton am Arlberg

 Nozawaonsen, Japan
 Schlanders, Italy

Sankt Georgen am Längsee
 Zoppola, Italy

Sankt Georgen am Walde

 Lalín, Spain
 Lalinde, France
 Linden, Germany
 Linden (Cuijk), Netherlands
 Lubbeek, Belgium

Sankt Jakob im Rosental
 Jesenice, Slovenia

Sankt Johann im Pongau
 Lage, Germany

Sankt Johann in Tirol

 Fuldabrück, Germany
 Redford, United States
 Rovaniemi, Finland
 Valeggio sul Mincio, Italy

Sankt Kanzian am Klopeiner See

 Divača, Slovenia
 San Canzian d'Isonzo, Italy

Sankt Lorenz
 Lőrinci, Hungary

Sankt Marein-Feistritz
 Grado, Italy

Sankt Martin am Wöllmißberg
 Unsere Liebe Frau im Walde-St. Felix, Italy

Sankt Paul im Lavanttal
 Sankt Blasien, Germany

Sankt Pölten

 Altoona, United States
 Brno, Czech Republic
 Clichy, France
 Heidenheim an der Brenz, Germany
 Kurashiki, Japan
 Wuhan, China

Sankt Ulrich bei Steyr
 Postbauer-Heng, Germany

Sankt Valentin

 Mimasaka, Japan
 Pelhřimov, Czech Republic
 Saint-Valentin, France

Sankt Veit an der Glan

 Haltern am See, Germany
 Kelmė, Lithuania
 Mainz-Kostheim (Wiesbaden), Germany
 San Vito al Tagliamento, Italy

Sc–Se
Scharnitz
 Plattling, Germany

Schenkenfelden
 Gyula, Hungary

Schiefling am Wörthersee
 Romans d'Isonzo, Italy

Schladming

 Felletin, France
 Furano, Japan
 Wetzlar, Germany

Schlierbach

 Hessisch Lichtenau, Germany
 Orgelet, France

Schönbach
 Herborn, Germany

Schrems
 Třeboň, Czech Republic

Schruns
 Myōkō, Japan

Schwaz

 Argentario (Trento), Italy
 Bourg-de-Péage, France
 East Grinstead, England, United Kingdom
 Mindelheim, Germany
 Sant Feliu de Guíxols, Spain
 Tramin an der Weinstraße, Italy
 Verbania, Italy

Schwechat

 Gladbeck, Germany
 Skalica, Slovakia

Seeboden am Millstätter See
 Saijō, Japan

Seefeld in Tirol
 Salzkotten, Germany

Seekirchen am Wallersee
 Frankenberg an der Eder, Germany

Seiersberg-Pirka

 Hausham, Germany
 Laktaši, Bosnia and Herzegovina

Semriach

 Bóly, Hungary
 Fauglia, Italy

Senftenberg 

 Senftenberg, Germany
 Žamberk, Czech Republic

Si–St
Sieghartskirchen
 Bábolna, Hungary

Silz
 Oxapampa, Peru

Sittersdorf
 Piran, Slovenia

Sölden
 Minamiuonuma, Japan

Sonntagberg
 Sárvár, Hungary

Spillern
 Kanice, Czech Republic

Spittal an der Drau

 Kočevje, Slovenia
 Löhne, Germany
 Porcia, Italy

Stadl-Paura
 Langenhagen, Germany

Stainz

 Schenna, Italy
 Villány, Hungary

Stams
 Kaisheim, Germany

Stans
 San Pietro in Cariano, Italy

Stegersbach
 Northampton, United States

Steuerberg
 Tavagnacco, Italy

Steyr

 Bethlehem, Palestine
 Kettering, United States
 Plauen, Germany
 San Benedetto del Tronto, Italy

Stockerau

 Andernach, Germany
 Baranovichi, Belarus
 Mosonmagyaróvár, Hungary

T
Tamsweg
 Iseo, Italy

Telfes im Stubai
 Freckenfeld, Germany

Telfs

 Elzach, Germany
 Lana, Italy

Thalgau
 Neu-Anspach, Germany

Thörl
 Ljubečna, Slovenia

Traismauer

 Aytos, Bulgaria
 Oberndorf bei Salzburg, Austria

Traun
 Forlimpopoli, Italy

Treffen am Ossiacher See

 Capriva del Friuli, Italy
 Öhringen, Germany

Trofaiach

 Clonmel, Ireland
 Kamnik, Slovenia

Trumau

 Alberndorf im Pulkautal, Austria
 Hainburg, Germany
 Vernouillet, France

Tschagguns
 Myōkō, Japan

U
Ulrichsberg

 Baiersdorf, Germany
 Horní Planá, Czech Republic

Umhausen
 Erlangen, Germany

Ungenach
 Bischofsmais, Germany

V
Velden am Wörther See

 Bled, Slovenia
 Gemona del Friuli, Italy

Vienna – as a general rule, Vienna is twinned to no other city in the world, and has only cooperation agreements on specific issuess limited in time.

Vienna 1 – Innere Stadt

 Budavár (Budapest), Hungary
 Old Town (Bratislava), Slovakia
 Prague 1 (Prague), Czech Republic
 Shapingba (Chongqing), China
 Śródmieście (Warsaw), Poland
 Taitō (Tokyo), Japan

Vienna 2 – Leopoldstadt
 Brooklyn (New York), United States

Vienna 5 – Margareten
 Lichtenberg (Berlin), Germany

Vienna 9 – Alsergrund

 Dongcheng (Beijing), China
 Takarazuka, Japan
 Wenzhou, China

Vienna 11 – Simmering
 Chaoyang (Beijing), China

Vienna 12 – Meidling
 Gifu, Japan

Vienna 13 – Hietzing

 Habikino, Japan
 Tanba, Japan

Vienna 14 – Penzing
 Prague 6 (Prague), Czech Republic

Vienna 17 – Hernals
 Fuchū, Japan

Vienna 19 – Döbling
 Setagaya (Tokyo), Japan

Vienna 21 – Floridsdorf

 Budapest XIII (Budapest), Hungary
 Katsushika (Tokyo), Japan

Vienna 22 – Donaustadt

 Arakawa (Tokyo), Japan
 Huangpu (Shanghai), China

Vienna 23 – Liesing

 Budapest XV (Budapest), Hungary
 Ulcinj, Montenegro

Villach

 Bamberg, Germany
 Kranj, Slovenia
 Suresnes, France
 Tolmin, Slovenia
 Udine, Italy

Vils
 Marktredwitz, Germany

Vöcklabruck

 Český Krumlov, Czech Republic
 Hauzenberg, Germany
 Slovenj Gradec, Slovenia

Vöcklamarkt
 Mertzig, Luxembourg

Voitsberg

 Hersbruck, Germany
 Kadarkút, Hungary
 Leśnica, Poland
 San Martino Buon Albergo, Italy
 Veliko Trojstvo, Croatia

Volders
 Mühlbach, Italy

Völkermarkt
 San Giorgio di Nogaro, Italy

Vomp

 Bad Endorf, Germany
 Nazelles-Négron, France

Vösendorf

 Kindberg, Austria
 Reggello, Italy
 Roßdorf, Germany

W
Wagna

 Metlika, Slovenia
 Ronchi dei Legionari, Italy

Waidhofen an der Thaya

 Heubach, Germany
 Telč, Czech Republic

Waidhofen an der Ybbs

 Battaglia Terme, Italy
 Bischofszell, Switzerland
 Freising, Germany
 Laatzen, Germany
 Tuttlingen, Germany

Wallern an der Trattnach

 Pressig, Germany
 Volary, Czech Republic
 Wallern im Burgenland, Germany

Wartberg ob der Aist
 Vodňany, Czech Republic

Weiden am See
 Weiden in der Oberpfalz, Germany

Weitensfeld im Gurktal
 Ragogna, Italy

Weiz

 Ajka, Hungary
 Grodzisk Mazowiecki, Poland
 Offenburg, Germany

Wels

 Bistrița, Romania
 Chichigalpa, Nicaragua
 Krasnodar, Russia
 Straubing, Germany
 Tábor, Czech Republic

Werfen
 Lengede, Italy

Wernberg
 Wernberg-Köblitz, Germany

Weyregg am Attersee
 Trimmis, Switzerland

Wiener Neustadt

 Desenzano del Garda, Italy
 Harbin, China
 Monheim am Rhein, Germany

Wies
 Zeulenroda-Triebes, Germany

Wieselburg
 Einbeck, Germany

Wölbling
 Bischofswiesen, Germany

Wolfern
 Taszár, Hungary

Wolfsberg

 Herzogenaurach, Germany
 Várpalota, Hungary

Wolkersdorf im Weinviertel
 Erbach an der Donau, Germany

Wörgl

 Albrechtice nad Orlicí, Czech Republic
 Suwa, Japan

Y
Ybbs an der Donau
 Bobbio, Italy

Yspertal
 Veselí nad Lužnicí, Czech Republic

Z
Zell
 Škofja Loka, Slovenia

Zell am Pettenfirst
 Perlesreut, Germany

Zell am See
 Vellmar, Germany

Zeltweg

 Enns, Austria
 Gyöngyös, Hungary

Zistersdorf

 Hodonín, Czech Republic
 Nienhagen, Germany
 Zwettl, Austria

Zwettl

 Jindřichův Hradec, Czech Republic
 Plochingen, Germany
 Zistersdorf, Austria

References

Austria
Twin towns
Populated places in Austria
Foreign relations of Austria
Cities and towns in Austria